Abri Tappeh (also Romanized as Abrī Tappeh) is a village in Azari Rural District, in the Central District of Esfarayen County, North Khorasan Province, Iran. At the 2006 census, its population was 259, in 59 families.

References 

Populated places in Esfarayen County